Fulton College may refer to:

 Fulton College (Fiji), a Seventh-day Adventist tertiary institution
 Fulton College Preparatory School, Van Nuys, California
 Fulton–Montgomery Community College, a two-year college in  Johnstown, New York
 Ira A. Fulton College of Engineering and Technology at Brigham Young University
 Mary Lou Fulton Teachers College, part of Arizona State University
 Westminster College, Missouri, formerly known as Fulton College